Imagina of Isenburg-Limburg (ca. 1255 – 29 September 1313?) was the Queen consort of Adolf of Nassau, King of Germany.

Life
Imagina was born in about 1255 (probably in Limburg an der Lahn) to Gerlach I of Limburg and Imagina of Blieskastel. Her father, from the House of Limburg (a collateral line of the House of Isenburg) held power over Limburg an der Lahn. Her paternal grandparents were Henry I of Isenburg-Grenzau and his wife Irmingard of Büdingen, Countess of Cleberg.

In 1270, she married Count Adolf of Nassau, from the Walramian Line of the House of Nassau. Their main residences were Idstein Castle and Sonnenberg Castle. After the election of Adolf in 1292 as King of Germany, she resided mainly in the Reichsburg Achalm when she did not accompany her husband on his travels.

After the death of her husband in the Battle of Göllheim, Imagina had the Early Gothic "King's Cross" erected on the battlefield. In 1309, she witnessed the transfer of her husband's remains from Rosenthal Abbey (in present-day Kerzenheim) to the Speyer Cathedral.

Imagina survived her husband by almost two decades but never remarried. For her widow's seat, Imagina initially took Weilburg Castle, and later moved to Klarenthal Abbey near Wiesbaden, where their daughter Adelheid presided as abbess. Imagina died at Klarenthal Abbey on 29 September 1313 and was buried there.

Children
Imagina's marriage with Adolf produced at least eight children:

 Heinrich, died young.
 Ruprecht, died 2 December 1304
 Gerlach I of Nassau-Wiesbaden.
 Adolf (1292–1294).
 Walram III of Nassau-Wiesbaden.
 Adelheid, Abbess of Klarenthal Abbey, died 26 May 1338.
 Imagina, died young.
 Matilde (before 1280 – 19 June 1323, in Heidelberg), married Rudolf I "the Stammerer", Duke of Upper Bavaria.

Sources
A. Ullrich, Die Landes- und Kirchengeschichte des Herzogthums Nassau von den ältesten Zeiten bis zur Reformation in übersichtlichem Zusammenhang, 2nd Edition. Wiesbaden, 1862. .

External links

1250s births
1313 deaths
People from Limburg an der Lahn
House of Isenburg
House of Nassau-Weilburg
German queens consort
13th-century German women
Royal reburials

Year of birth uncertain